The 2012 Southern Miss Golden Eagles football team represented the University of Southern Mississippi in the 2012 NCAA Division I FBS football season as a member of the East Division of Conference USA. They were led by first-year head coach Ellis Johnson and played their home games at M. M. Roberts Stadium in Hattiesburg, Mississippi. The 2012 squad finished the season winless with a final record of 0–12 and after only one year at the helm, Johnson along with his entire staff was fired.

Schedule

Game summaries

@ Nebraska

East Carolina

@ WKU

Louisville

Last meeting was in the 2010 Beef 'O' Brady's Bowl.

Boise State

@ UCF

Marshall

@ Rice

UAB

@ SMU

UTEP

@ Memphis

References

Southern Miss
Southern Miss Golden Eagles football seasons
College football winless seasons
Southern Miss Golden Eagles football